Lernanthropidae is a family of copepods belonging to the order Siphonostomatoida.

Genera:
 Aethon Krøyer, 1837
 Lernanthropinus Ho & Do, 1985
 Lernanthropodes Bere, 1936
 Lernanthropsis Ho & Do, 1985
 Lernanthropus de Blainville, 1822
 Mitrapus Song & Chen, 1976
 Norion Nordmann, 1864
 Sagum Wilson, 1913

References

Copepods